The 2012 Swiss Indoors was a tennis tournament that was played on indoor hard courts. It was the 43rd edition of the event known that year as the Swiss Indoors, and was part of the 500 series of the 2012 ATP World Tour. It was held at the St. Jakobshalle in Basel, Switzerland, from 22 October until 28 October 2012. Second-seeded Juan Martín del Potro won the singles title.

Singles main draw entrants

Seeds

1 Rankings as of October 15, 2012

Other entrants
The following players received wildcards into the singles main draw:
  Marco Chiudinelli
  Paul-Henri Mathieu
  Henri Laaksonen

The following players received entry from the qualifying draw:
  Radek Štěpánek
  Łukasz Kubot
  Andrey Kuznetsov
  Benjamin Becker

Withdrawals
  Rafael Nadal (left knee injury)
  Kei Nishikori (ankle injury) 
  Andy Murray

Doubles main draw entrants

Seeds

1 Rankings as of October 15, 2012

Other entrants
The following teams received wildcards into the doubles main draw:
  Marco Chiudinelli /  Michael Lammer
  Adrien Bossel /  Henri Laaksonen

Finals

Singles

 Juan Martín del Potro  defeated  Roger Federer, 6–4, 6–7(5–7), 7–6(7–3)

Doubles

 Daniel Nestor /  Nenad Zimonjić defeated  Treat Conrad Huey /  Dominic Inglot, 7–5, 6–7(4–7), [10–5]

References

External links
Official website

2012 ATP World Tour
2012
Indoors